Emily Camille Kokal (born September 30, 1980) is an American musician from Chico, California. She is best known as the singer and guitarist of the indie rock band Warpaint. Kokal is one of the founding members of the band.

Early life
Kokal was born in Chico, California. At age 10, she moved to Eugene, Oregon, where she met Theresa Wayman, with whom she would later start Warpaint. The two traveled through Europe together in their late teenage years and lived together in New York and Los Angeles. At age 19, Kokal met Jenny Lee Lindberg, another founding member of Warpaint, in LA.

Career
Kokal was the lead singer, guitarist and organist for a project called the Little Two's. In 2001, the band self-released their only album, titled World War IV.

In February 2004, Warpaint was formed in Los Angeles, with Kokal singing and playing guitar. As of 2017, Kokal and Warpaint have released three albums and an EP. On the forming of the band, Kokal stated in an interview: "I've always felt this about this band, that it felt blessed. It felt that the right paths were crossing at the right times and the stars were aligned".

Kokal has also made guest appearances as a singer, including singing the chorus in the Red Hot Chili Peppers' song "Desecration Smile".

In 2017, Kokal and bandmate Wayman were voted the "Best Alternative Guitarists in the World Right Now" by MusicRadar and Total Guitar readers.

Personal life
Kokal was previously in a relationship with Red Hot Chili Peppers guitarist John Frusciante. Since 2013, Kokal has been in a relationship with LA-based producer j.franxis, of deafmute and FACIAL, and they have a daughter together.

Discography
With Warpaint

Exquisite Corpse EP (2008)
The Fool (2010)
Warpaint (2014)
Heads Up (2016)
Radiate Like This (2022)

References

1980 births
Art rock musicians
Living people
American indie rock musicians
Guitarists from Los Angeles
Guitarists from Oregon
Musicians from Eugene, Oregon
People from Chico, California
Singers from California
Songwriters from California
Songwriters from Oregon
Singers from Oregon
21st-century American women singers
21st-century American women guitarists
21st-century American guitarists
Warpaint (band) members
21st-century American singers